Mark Maryboy (born December 10, 1955) is a retired American politician for San Juan County, Utah, and a former Navajo Nation Council Delegate for the Utah Navajo Section of the Navajo Tribe. He is the brother of Kenneth Maryboy who currently serves as the Navejo Nation Council Delegate, in the positions he once stood. Mark is of the Navajo Indian Tribe.

Mark Maryboy was also the San Juan County, Utah Commissioner for District Three. He made history when he was elected in 1986 as the first Native American county commissioner in Utah's history.

Rebecca M. Benally along with the former Navajo Nation Council Delegate Mark Maryboy and protesters from the Aneth Chapter Blocked the main ExxonMobil corporate office for three days in Aneth, Utah.

Life and education 
Maryboy was born on December 10, 1955, at St. Christopher's mission near Bluff, Utah. He was the fifth of eight children, all of whom were raised in a Navajo hogan.

Mark attended BIA boarding schools in Kayenta and Aneth at varied times, even though it was hard for him to be separated from his parents during those periods. Government schools were difficult for him as there seemed to be a deliberate attempt to destroy the Indian person that he was.

Angry and resentful because of harsh treatment, he ran away from boarding school while in third grade. His parents then enrolled him and his beloved brother, Herbert, in the public school at Bluff. They were the first reservation Navajo students to attend public school in San Juan County.

Upon graduation from San Juan High School in Blanding, Utah he attended the University of Utah, majoring in history with a minor in business. He garnered a B.A. degree in 1978.

Political representative 

Some time after graduation, he returned to the Navajo Reservation. Working as the Director of Education for the Utah Navajo Development Council, he supervised Headstart, Adult Education, and vocational education programs. He created teacher training programs and a class for teen mothers.

Maryboy married Rosylyn Johnson, who is also a Social Worker on the reservation. They have one daughter.

San Juan County Commissioner 

One hundred and thirty years after Native Americans were pushed to isolated reservations, the Navajo people of Utah reclaimed a place in the American political process.

In 1986, Maryboy, then age 31 and politically ambitious, ran for San Juan Commissioner. This was the first election after the county was divided by Justice Department decree into commissioner districts. He was elected a San Juan County Commissioner and became the first Native American to hold such a position in the state of Utah.

An elected official, he realized even greater inequities in services given to his Navajo constituents. The Navajo people were bringing in more money for the county than they were receiving back in services. He mixed it up with the other commissioners, often battling the always capable right-wing former Commissioner Calvin Black, the undisputed kingpin of San Juan County politics, during hotly contested commission meetings.

Maryboy's four terms on the San Juan County Commission - particularly the first half-dozen years - were the subject of much press and the stuff of legend-making. His sword-crossing with the late commission chairman, Cal Black, spiked tensions across southern Utah as Maryboy fought for funding for roads, sanitation and water for Utah's Navajos.

In 1989 Navajo elders and other Democratic stalwarts determined to run a Navajo for every county post up for election. 56 percent of San Juan's population was Navajo at the time.  The campaign aimed at getting tribal members to the polls was called "Niha-Whol-Zhiizh", meaning "It's our turn."

The Democratic-Navajo plan fizzled. Maryboy won a second commission term, but was the only Navajo Indian elected.

Navajo Nation Council Delegate 
In November 1990, he was elected to the Navajo Nation Council as a council delegate from the Aneth area.

He sat on the advisory board of the College of Social & Behavioral Science at the University of Utah. He is currently the chairman of the Navajo Nation Council Budget & Finance Committee.

Maryboy met President Bill Clinton in 1992 at the Democratic National Convention at Madison Square Garden. Maryboy delivered a prayer in Navajo at one of the sessions. He was a delegate to the United Nations Conference for Indigenous peoples in Geneva, Switzerland in July 1992. He was appointed to serve on the Utah Advisory Committee for the United States Commission on Civil Rights in 1993. He was appointed by President Clinton to serve on the National Advisory Council on Indian Education in 1994.

Navajo Tribal Council Assault
In April 2006, Navajo Nation Council Speaker Lawrence T. Morgan faced a charge of criminal battery when he struck Council Delegate Mark.

Navajo Council Speaker Morgan struck Maryboy in the chest after Maryboy made a complaint to the speaker that he didn't help Maryboy bring up legislation that had been skipped over earlier that day.

The item—formal condolences to the family of late Council Delegate Curley John of Aneth, whose family was in the gallery—was skipped because Maryboy was out of the Council Chambers dealing with Constituents.

Maryboy tried later to put the item back on the agenda but was ruled out of order, the paper reported

Aneth Chapter members had demanded Morgan issue a public apology, following the bathroom scuffle, during one of Aneth's monthly chapter meetings in Utah.  Speaker Morgan ignored the Aneth meeting, overall never presenting himself.

Utah Navajo Commission 
The Utah Navajo Commission manages revenues derived from mineral development on the Utah portion of the reservation for the Utah Navajos. The population of Utah Dine' is nearing 10,000 enrolled members. Mark Maryboy serves with this entity as well seeing to the deployment of monetary funds and the Navajo energy issues in San Juan County.

Navajo water rights issue 
In 2002 he and the Utah Navajo Commission urged the Navajo Nation to reassert Colorado River water claims the tribe waived in the late 1960s to help facilitate a power plant near Page, Arizona.

In a resolution to the Navajo Nation Council this week, the Utah Navajo also urged the Navajo tribe's water attorney be fired and the tribe create an independent water commission to reform the tribe's water policy

According to the Utah Navajo Commission, the tribe could claim between one and two million acre feet (2.5 km³) of Colorado River water, which potentially could be worth billions of dollars.

Mark always felt that it was long past time for the Navajo Nation to take aggressive and comprehensive action on the tribe's dormant water rights.

The council waived at least a portion of its rights in a 1968 agreement with the federal government and the Salt River Project, which planned to build a coal-fired power plant near Page.

Utah Navajo Oil 

In 1933, Congress created the Utah Navajo Trust Fund. It is unique in that the state was deemed the trustee-delegate for oil pumped from Navajo land.

According to the law, 37.5 percent of royalties are supposed to go to Utah Navajos. But a 1991 report from the state found gross mismanagement. Some people were later indicted for misusing the trust fund

Navajos living in nearby San Juan County in southeastern Utah have long protested the saturation of oil and gas wells around their homes. Mark and other Utah Navajos have long argued that the Navajo Nation returns little profit to Navajos living in desperate conditions in the Utah portion of tribal land.

Utah Navajo allegations of corruption within the U.S. Interior gained support from an Interior whistleblower in 2003.

Aneth Oil Crisis
In 1997, local residents began the Aneth Oil Protest against Exxon-Mobil's Utah Navajo community policies. Protesters from the Aneth Chapter blocked the main ExxonMobil Corp. Office for 3 days at the McElmo Oil Plant near Aneth, Utah.

From the start, the protest was made up of local Navajo people who were becoming increasingly angry at Exxon-Mobil's stance towards the environment and its hiring practices within the local communities. Many other national political activist organizations such as the American Indian Movement wanted to get involved with the protest. However, it was agreed to not include outside affiliates, which might result in losing the original meaning and message of the protest  .

Former Navajo Nation president Albert Hale was also mobilized to the northernmost corner of the Navajo Nation where the protest was initiated. Mark, along with members of the Aneth Community, helped create a new standard for the Navajo workers working in the Aneth Oil area as well as the hiring process.

Life after politics 
Heeding to his father's wishes, he did not seek a fifth term on the council.

Maryboy established Utah Navajo Health Systems in 1999 along with Donna Singer. Then he ramrodded tribal legislation that allows the agency to keep its profits, rather than return them to Window Rock. This remains a legacy for the policies Maryboy left.

Utah Navajo Oil Revenues
Recently Counsel Delegates Kenneth Maryboy, Davis Filfred, and Former Counsel Delegate Mark Maryboy have been actively working to ensure that the Aneth Oil Royalties stay with the Utah Navajo people.

However such causes are not without competition, the Navajo Nation itself has been working counter to the Utah Navajo people in taking over the Aneth Oil Revenues. It presents a significant problem with a line of issues Kenneth is up against.

On June 16, 2008, Kenneth Maryboy, Mark Maryboy, Davis Filfred, and the honorable Phil Lyman of Blanding, Utah will travel to Washington, D.C. to present a working model of how an easy transition from the State of Utah handling Utah Navajo royalty money, to a functioning Utah Navajo organization before Congress.

References

External links 
San Juan County Website
"Bridging Two Worlds"
"THE POLITICAL MARK MARYBOY"
Navajos blocked Mobil Oil Corp. offices near Aneth, Utah January 1997
Mobil Settles Aneth Oil Spills Case
"Navajos in Utah fight state over trust mismanagement"
Oil and gas drilling leases increase for sacred lands 
Salt Lake Tribune Public Lands director's departure pleases environmentalists, some Navajos
Aneth Oil Field
"Navajos say Utah cheated their tribe"
Speaker Morgan accused of battery against council delegate Maryboy
Utah Democratic Party

1955 births
Living people
Members of the Navajo Nation Council
County commissioners in Utah
University of Utah alumni
Education reform
People from San Juan County, Utah
Utah Democrats
20th-century Native Americans
21st-century Native Americans
Native American people from Utah